Elephanta can mean:
Elephanta (wind), a wind off the Malabar coast of India
Elephanta Island, an island in Mumbai Harbour, India
Elephanta Caves, cave temples on Elephanta Island
Elephanta (comic), a 1977 Indian comic